Southmoreland School District is a small, suburban public school district located in northern Fayette County, Pennsylvania and southern Westmoreland County, Pennsylvania. The boroughs of Scottdale and Everson, as well as the townships of East Huntington and Upper Tyrone are within district boundaries. Southmoreland School District encompasses approximately 43 square miles. According to 2000 federal census data, it serves a resident population of 15,639. In 2009, the district residents’ per capita income was $15,876, while the median family income was $38,993. In the Commonwealth, the median family income was 
$49,501 and the United States median family income was $49,445, in 2010.

Schools

Extracurriculars
The district offers a variety of clubs, activities and sports.

Sports Teams

Vocational-Technical School
Students in grades 10 to 12 in the Southmoreland School District have the opportunity to attend the Central Westmoreland Career and Technology Center in New Stanton.

References

External links
 Southmoreland School District

Education in Pittsburgh area
School districts in Fayette County, Pennsylvania
School districts in Westmoreland County, Pennsylvania